Metalectra edilis is a species of moth in the family Erebidae. It is found in North America.

The MONA or Hodges number for Metalectra edilis is 8507.

References

Further reading

 
 
 

Boletobiinae
Articles created by Qbugbot
Moths described in 1906